Currently, there is no legal recognition of same-sex unions in Singapore.

Housing
In Singapore, access to public housing is the biggest benefit granted to married couples and is officially recognized as key pillar of support for relationships. Public housing is the most affordable type of housing for the middle and working class due to the high price of housing in Singapore. Purchasing a Housing Development Board (HDB) flat is a major step towards married life for almost all couples intending to formalize their relationship and is entrenched in Singapore society. Upwards of 80% of Singaporean families live in public housing apartments sold by the government.

Same sex couples in Singapore, whether citizens or foreigners, cannot own their own homes through the public housing scheme, and many rent as they are unable to afford private housing. Same-sex partners - both must be above 35 and Singapore Citizens - can purchase a flat under the Joint Singles Scheme.

Private housing, a type of property typically several times more expensive than public housing, but open to the public and foreigners, may be purchased by same-sex couples both Singaporean and foreign.

Immigration rights
Legal and immigration rights are not awarded to binational couples, where one partner is a Singaporean or Singaporean permanent resident. Dependent visas, which are usually issued for heterosexual spouses, are not available for same-sex couples. Tax rights, wills, and spousal insurance benefits do not include same-sex couples. There is no recognition of same-sex couples in most areas of concern such as hospital visitation and Central Provident Fund benefits.

Public opinion
According to 2013 polling, some 75% of Singaporeans opposed same-sex marriage.

In 2019, a poll conducted by YouGov with 1,033 respondents showed that about one-third (34%) of Singaporeans backed same-sex partnerships, while 43% opposed their legalization, and the remaining 23% were uncertain. Support was more notable among younger respondents: 50% of people aged 18 to 34 supported civil partnerships and 20% were opposed. In contrast, only 22% of those aged 55 and over supported. 41% of university degree holders agreed with the legalisation of same-sex partnerships, whereas only 26% of respondents without a university degree were in favour. Of those who considered themselves "very much" religious, only 23% supported civil partnerships. 51% of people who considered themselves "not at all" religious expressed support. Apart from irreligious people, majority support for same-sex partnerships was also found in respondents who identified as LGBT (71% against 22%) and those who personally knew a person in a same-sex relationship (52% against 33%).

A survey conducted by the Institute of Policy Studies between August 2018 and January 2019 revealed that Singaporean society was still largely conservative but becoming more liberal on LGBT rights. The survey showed that more than 20% of people said that sexual relations between adults of the same sex were not wrong at all or not wrong most of the time, a rise of about 10% from 2013. Around 27% felt the same way about same-sex marriage (up from 15% in 2013) and 30% did so about same-sex couples adopting a child (up from 24% in 2013).

A mid-2019 poll conducted by the Institute of Policy Studies found that opposition to same-sex marriage in Singapore had fallen to 60%, down from 74% in 2013. The poll also found that nearly six in ten Singaporeans aged between 18 and 25 believed same-sex marriage is not wrong.

In June 2019, an online survey conducted by Blackbox Research revealed that 56% of Singaporeans are opposed to other countries following Taiwan’s example in legalising same-sex marriage, while 44% said “yes”. When asked on how they feel that more than 300 same-sex couples were married in Taiwan the first week after the new law was passed. About 49% of those surveyed felt positive about the statement, with 14% feeling “strongly positive”, while 35% feeling “somewhat positive”. Conversely, 51% responded negatively to that, 20% felt “strongly negative” while 31% were “somewhat negative”.

Government's view
On 21 August 2022, Prime Minister Lee Hsien Loong announced that the Government will repeal Section 377A of the Penal Code, effectively ending criminalisation of sexual relations between men both de facto and de jure. Sex between women has never been criminalised. On 22 August 2022, Home Affairs and Law Minister K. Shanmugam added that the Constitution will be amended to protect Parliament's right to define marriage instead of the judiciary, leaving open the possibility for Parliament to legalise same-sex marriages or civil unions through a simple majority.

See also
LGBT rights in Singapore
Recognition of same-sex unions in Asia

References

Singapore
LGBT rights in Singapore